Amsoldingersee is small lake adjacent to the town of Amsoldingen, in the Upper Gürbetal.  It is located near the city of Thun, Switzerland. The lake has a surface area of 38 hectares and a maximum length of 1.1 km and width of 500 m. The maximum depth is 14 m. It is fed by Rotmoos-Bach from the smaller Uebeschisee.

See also
List of lakes of Switzerland

Lakes of the canton of Bern
Lakes of Switzerland
LAmsoldingersee

References